The 1995 Nations Cup was the fourth event of six in the 1995–96
ISU Champions Series, a senior-level international invitational competition series. It was held in Gelsenkirchen on November 23–25. Medals were awarded in the disciplines of men's singles, ladies' singles, pair skating, and ice dancing. Skaters earned points toward qualifying for the 1995–96 Champions Series Final.

Results

Men

Ladies

Pairs

Ice dancing

External links
 1995 Champions Series

Nations Cup, 1995
Bofrost Cup on Ice